, abbreviated , is a Japanese martial art that emphasizes being aware and capable of quickly drawing the sword and responding to sudden attacks.

Iaido consists of four main components: the smooth, controlled movements of drawing the sword from its scabbard (or saya), striking or cutting an opponent, shaking blood from the blade, and replacing the sword in the scabbard. While beginning practitioners of iaido may start learning with a wooden sword (bokken) depending on the teaching style of a particular instructor, most of the practitioners use a blunt-edged sword called an iaitō or mogitō. Few, more experienced, iaido practitioners use a sharp-edged sword (shinken).

Practitioners of iaido are called iaidoka.

Origins of the name

The origin of the first two characters, is believed to come from saying , which can be roughly translated as "being constantly (prepared), match/meet (the opposition) immediately". Thus the primary emphasis in 'iai' is on the psychological state of being present (居). The secondary emphasis is on drawing the sword and responding to the sudden attack as quickly as possible (合).

The last character, is generally translated into English as the way. The term "iaido" approximately translates into English as "the way of mental presence and immediate reaction", and was popularized by Nakayama Hakudo.

Purpose
Iaido encompasses hundreds of styles of swordsmanship, all of which subscribe to non-combative aims and purposes. Iaido is an intrinsic form of Japanese modern budo.

Iaido is a reflection of the morals of the classical warrior and to build a spiritually harmonious person possessed of high intellect, sensitivity, and resolute will.
Iaido is for the most part performed solo as an issue of kata, executing changed strategies against single or various fanciful rivals. Every kata starts and finishes with the sword sheathed. Regardless of the sword method, creative ability and concentration are required to maintain the feeling of a genuine battle and to keep the kata new. Iaidoka are often expected to practice kendo to maintain the combative spirit. It is normal for high-ranking kendoka to hold high rank in iaido as well, and vice versa.

To perform the kata appropriately, iaidoka likewise learn carriage and development, grip and swing. At times iaidoka will practice complementary kata from kendo or kenjutsu. Unlike kendo, iaido practice never involves sparring.

Moral and religious influences
The metaphysical aspects of iaido have been influenced by several philosophical and religious currents. Iaido blends the ethics of Confucianism, methods of Zen, philosophical Taoism, the purifying rites of Shinto and aspects of bushido.

Seitei-gata techniques

The 12 official kata currently recognised by the All Japan Kendo Federation are (in Romanised form):
 Mae
 Ushiro
 Ukenagashi
 Tsuka-ate
 Kesagiri
 Morote-tsuki
 Sanpōgiri
 Ganmen-ate
 Soete-zuki
 Shihōgiri
 Sōgiri
 Nukiuchi

Because iaido is practiced with a weapon, it is almost entirely practiced using solitary forms, or kata performed against one or more imaginary opponents. Multiple-person kata exist in some schools of iaido; for safety, iaidoka  usually use bokken for such kata practice. Iaido does include competition in the form of kata, but does not use sparring of any kind. Because of this non-fighting practice, and iaido's emphasis on precise, controlled, fluid motion, it is sometimes referred to as "moving Zen." Most of the styles and schools do not practice tameshigiri, cutting techniques.

A part of iaido is nukitsuke. This is a quick draw of the sword, accomplished by simultaneously drawing the sword from the saya and also moving the saya back in saya-biki.

History

Iaido started in the mid-1500s. Hayashizaki Jinsuke Shigenobu (1542 - 1621) is generally acknowledged as the organizer of Iaido. There were many different Koryu (customary schools), however just a few remain practiced today. Just about every one of them additionally concentrate on more seasoned school created amid 16-seventeenth century, in the same way as Muso-Shinden-ryu, Hoki-ryu, Muso-Jikiden-Eishin-ryu, Shinto-Munen-ryu, Tamiya-ryu, Yagyu-Shinkage-ryu, Mugai-ryu, Sekiguchi-ryu, et cetera.

After the collapse of the Japanese feudal system in 1868 the founders of the modern disciplines borrowed from the theory and the practice of classical disciplines as they had studied or practiced. The founding in 1895 of the Dai Nippon Butoku Kai (DNBK) 大日本武徳会 (lit. "Greater Japan Martial Virtue Society") in Kyoto, Japan. was also an important contribution to the development of modern Japanese swordsmanship. In 1932 DNBK officially approved and recognized the Japanese discipline, iaido; this year was the first time the term iaido appeared in Japan. After this initiative the modern forms of swordsmanship is organised in several iaido organisations.  During the post-war occupation of Japan, the Dai Nippon Butoku Kai and its affiliates were disbanded by the Allies of World War II in the period 1945–1950. However, in 1950, the Dai Nippon Butoku Kai was reestablished and the practice of the Japanese martial disciplines began again.

The  (ZNIR) was founded in 1948.

IMAF is a Japanese organization promoting international Budō, and has seven divisions representing the various Japanese martial arts, including iaido.

Also in 1952, the All Japan Kendo Federation (ZNKR) was founded.

Upon formation of various organizations overseeing martial arts, a problem of commonality appeared. Since members of the organization were drawn from various backgrounds, and had experience practicing different schools of iaido, there arose a need for a common set of kata, that would be known by all members of organization, and that could be used for fair grading of practitioner's skill. Two of the largest Japanese organizations, All Japan Kendo Federation (ZNKR) and All Japan Iaido Federation (ZNIR), each created their own representative set of kata for this purpose.

Kata under the respective iaido organizations

Tōhō Iaido
The All Japan Iaido Federation (ZNIR, Zen Nihon Iaido Renmei, founded 1948) has a set of five koryu iaido forms, called Tōhō, contributed from the five major schools whose teachers were involved in the creation of the organization.

Musō Jikiden Eishin-ryū School founded during the late Muromachi period (c. 1590). ('Mae-giri')
Mugai-ryū School founded in 1695. ('Zengo-giri')
Shindō Munen-ryū School founded in the early 1700s. ('Kiri-age')
Suiō-ryū School founded during the late Sengoku period (c. 1600). ('Shihō-giri')
Hōki-ryū School founded during the late Muromachi period (c. 1590). ('Kissaki-gaeshi')

Seitei Iaido
Seitei or Zen Nippon Kendo Renmei Iaido (制定) are technical forms based on seitei-gata, or standard forms of sword-drawing techniques, created by the Zen Nihon Kendo Renmei (All Japan Kendo Federation). This standard set of iaido kata was created in 1969 by a committee formed by the All Japan Kendo Federation (AJKF, Zen Nippon Kendo Renmei or ZNKR).
The twelve Seitei iaido forms (seitei-gata) are standardised for the tuition, promotion and propagation of iaido at the iaido clubs, that are members of the regional Kendo federations. All dojos, that are members of the regional Kendo federations teach this set. Since member federations of International Kendo Federation (FIK) uses seitei gata as a standard for their iaido exams and shiai, seitei iaido has  become the most widely practised form of iaido in Japan and the rest of the world.

Other organizations
Single-style federations usually do not have a standardized "grading" set of kata, and use kata from their koryu curriculum for grading and demonstrations.

Schools

Many iaido organisations promote sword technique from the seiza (sitting position) and refer to their art as iaido. One of the popular versions of these is the Musō Shinden-ryū 夢想神伝流, an iaido system created by Nakayama Hakudō (1872–1958) in 1932. The Musō Shinden-ryū is an interpretation of one of the Jinsuke-Eishin lines, called Shimomura-ha.

The other line of Jinsuke-Eishin, called Tanimura-ha, was created by Gotō Magobei Masasuke (died 1898) and Ōe Masaji Shikei (1852–1927). It was Ōe Masaji Shikei who began formally referring to his iaido branch as the Musō Jikiden Eishin-ryū 無双直伝英信流 during the Taishō era (1912–1926).

Another popular iai school mostly found worldwide is Mugai ryu. Mugai-ryū (無外流) or "Outer Nothingness School" is a Japanese koryū martial art school founded by Tsuji Gettan Sukemochi (辻月丹資茂) on 23 June 1680. Its formal name is Mugai Shinden Kenpō (無外真伝剣法).
Actually in the beginning, Mugai Ryu started as kenjutsu only school, but send and recommend its disciples to learn another koryu named "Jikyo-ryu iaijutsu", and after Jikyo ryu vanished without any successor, it is renamed into Mugai ryu iaijutsu/iaido up until today.

Another popular Iaido school is Toyama-ryū (戸山流), which was established in 1925 in Japan. It was created by the Japanese army during World War II to create a simplified form. This style emphasizes the most important aspects of drawing and cutting. After the war it became obsolete, but was revived after 1952.

Ranks

Ranking in iaido depends on the school and/or the member federations to which a particular school belongs. Iaido as it is practiced by the International Kendo Federation (FIK) and All Japan Iaido Federation (ZNIR) uses the kyu-dan system, created in 1883.

Modern kendo is almost entirely governed by the FIK, including the ranking system.
Iaido is commonly associated with either the FIK or the ZNIR, although there are many extant koryū which may potentially use the menkyo system of grading, or a different system entirely. Iaido as governed by the FIK establishes 10th dan as the maximum attainable rank, though there are no living 10th practitioners in Kendo, there still remains many in Iaido. While there are some living 9th dan practitioners of kendo, the All Japan Kendo Federation only currently awards up to 8th dan. Most other member federations of the FIK have followed suit.

International Iaido Sport Competition

Iaido, in its modern form, is practiced as a competitive sport, separately regulated by the All Japan Kendo Federation and All Japan Iaido Federations.

An iaido competition consists of two or more iaidoka performing their kata next to each other and simultaneously. The competitors will be judged by a panel of judges according to the standardized regulations.

The European Kendo Federation has arranged European iaido championships since 1993, and this competition continues to be held every year with a few exceptions.

Organisations
Many national and regional organisations manage and promote iaido activities. The following is a list of international organisations which include iaido:

Dai Nippon Butoku Kai (DNBK), established in 1895 in Kyoto, approved and recognized the discipline iaido.

The International Martial Arts Federation (IMAF) was established in Kyoto in 1952 and is dedicated to the promotion and development of the martial arts worldwide, including iaido.

International Kendo Federation (FIK), established in 1970, an international organization for Kendo, Iaido and Jodo practitioners, which many national Kendo federations are a member of.

All Japan Iaido Federation (or Zen Nippon Iaido Renmei) (ZNIR) was established in 1954 "in accordance with the Japanese bushido spirit to pass on the time-honoured system of Kobudo Iaido".

The World Musō Jikiden Eishin-ryū Iaido Federation, established in Tokyo in 2011, is dedicated to ensuring the orthodox transmission of MJER Iaido to future generations worldwide, as well as promoting and preserving the development of other schools.

Zen Nihon Toyama Ryu Iaido Renmei (ZNTIR) established in Machida Japan after WW II was created as "Toyama-Ryu Shinko kai" established by Tokutomi Tasaburo and Nakamura Taizaburo who were Gunto Soho instructors at the Toyama Ryu Military Academy for the Japanese Imperial Army. Over time the "Toyama-Ryu Shinko-Kai" was renamed as Zen Nihon Toyama Ryu Iaido Renmei, and practice eight kata from a derivative of Gunto Soho.

Murayama City, the birthplace of iaido, operates a number of iaido experience and training programs. This includes training with some of the iaido masters and english speaking teachers in Yamagata.

See also

Battōjutsu
Fast draw
Iaijutsu
Kendo
Kenjutsu
Samurai
Zen Nippon Kendo Renmei Iaido

References

External links
Following organisations are national Iaido federations in Japan:
All Japan Kendo Federation (ZNKR/AJKF), a national organization for Kendo, Iaido and Jodo practitioners, member of FIK. 
Dai Nippon Butoku Kai (DNBK) in Kyoto, a national - and international organisation for iaido in Japan. 
International Martial Arts Federation (IMAF) in Kyoto, a national - and international organisation for iaido in Japan. 
(Wayback Machine copy)
All Japan Iaido Federation (Specialized information site ZNIR). 
Japan Iaido Federation (Nippon Iaido Renmei/NIR)
(Wayback Machine copy)
Iaido in the United States is under the auspices of the All-US Kendo Federation  (AUSKF) and the various regional Kendo federations that are members of the AUSKF.

Iaido Training in Japan 
Iaido training in Murayama City

 
Japanese martial arts
Dō
Japanese swordsmanship
Sports originating in Japan
Swordsmanship